Savvas Topalidis (born 18 October 1997 in Katerini, Greece) is a Greek professional footballer who plays as a right back for Super League 2 club Niki Volos.

Club career
On June 23, 2016 it was announced that Topalidis signed a long year season contract with Aiginiakos, on loan from PAOK.

References

External links
 

1997 births
Living people
Greek footballers
Association football defenders
Greece youth international footballers
Super League Greece players
Football League (Greece) players
Gamma Ethniki players
Super League Greece 2 players
PAOK FC players
Aiginiakos F.C. players
Pierikos F.C. players
Niki Volos F.C. players
Footballers from Katerini